Rossella Tarolo (born 28 December 1964) is a former Italian sprinter who represented Italy at the 1988 Olympic Games in Seoul, South Korea.

Biography
Tarolo was born in Treviso, Italy. She is a four time  Italian National Champion and represented Italy 30 times in international competition from 1984 to 1993. She participated at the 1988 Olympic Games in Seoul.

Achievements

National titles
Italian National 100 metres Champion (1986)
Two-time Italian National 200 metres Champion (1989, 1991)
Italian Indoor 200 metres Champion (1986)

See also
Italian all-time lists - 200 metres

References

External links
 

1964 births
Sportspeople from Treviso
Italian female sprinters
Living people
Athletes (track and field) at the 1988 Summer Olympics
Olympic athletes of Italy
World Athletics Championships athletes for Italy
Mediterranean Games silver medalists for Italy
Athletes (track and field) at the 1991 Mediterranean Games
Mediterranean Games medalists in athletics
Olympic female sprinters